Nucleoside diphosphate kinase A is an enzyme that in humans is encoded by the NME1 gene. It is thought to be a metastasis suppressor.

Function 

This gene (NME1) was identified because of its reduced mRNA transcript levels in highly metastatic cells. Nucleoside diphosphate kinase (NDK) exists as a hexamer composed of 'A' (encoded by this gene) and 'B' (encoded by NME2) isoforms. Mutations in this gene have been identified in aggressive neuroblastomas. Two transcript variants encoding different isoforms have been found for this gene. Co-transcription of this gene and the neighboring downstream gene (NME2) generates naturally occurring transcripts (NME1-NME2), which encodes a fusion protein consisting of sequence sharing identity with each individual gene product.

A bioinformatics study published in 2023 suggested that the NME1 gene might have a prognostic role in neuroblastoma.

Interactions 

NME1 has been shown to interact with:

 Aurora A kinase, 
 CD29 
 NME3, 
 Protein SET, 
 RAR-related orphan receptor alpha, 
 RAR-related orphan receptor beta, and
 TERF1.

See also 
Nucleoside-diphosphate kinase

References

Further reading